Indian River County is a county located in the southeastern and east-central portions of the U.S. state of Florida. As of the 2020 census, the population was 159,788. Its seat is Vero Beach. It is Florida's 7th richest county and in 2000 was the 87th richest county in the U.S. by per capita income.

Indian River County comprises the Sebastian-Vero Beach, Florida, Metropolitan Statistical Area, which is included in the Miami-Fort Lauderdale-Port St. Lucie, Florida, Combined Statistical Area.

History
Prior to 1821 the area of Indian River County was part of the Spanish colony of East Florida. In 1822 this area became part of St. Johns County, and in 1824 it became part of Mosquito County (original name of Orange County).

The Second Seminole War was fought in 1835 and from 1838 to 1839. Fort Vinton was built for this purpose near the intersection of present-day Florida State Road 60 and 122nd Avenue.

In 1844 the county's portion of Mosquito County became part of newly created St. Lucia County. In 1855 St. Lucia County was renamed Brevard County. In 1905 St. Lucie County was formed from the southern portion of Brevard County; in 1925 Indian River County was formed from the northern portion of St. Lucie County. It was named for the Indian River, which runs through the eastern portion of the county.

Geography

Adjacent counties
 Brevard County - north
 St. Lucie County - south
 Okeechobee County - southwest
 Osceola County - northwest

National protected areas
 Archie Carr National Wildlife Refuge (part)
 Pelican Island National Wildlife Refuge

Climate and birds 
Eight bird species in Indian River County are listed as "highly vulnerable" to climate change:
 Red-headed woodpecker
 Gray kingbird
 Fish crow
 Brown thrasher
 Eastern towhee
 Boat-tailed grackle
 Snail kite 
 Yellow-throated warbler

Demographics

As of the 2020 United States census, there were 159,788 people, 60,959 households, and 37,647 families residing in the county.

As of the census of 2000, there were 112,947 people, 49,137 households, and 32,725 families residing in the county. There were 57,902 housing units at an average density of 115 per square mile (44/km2). The racial makeup of the county was 87.43% White, 8.19% Black or African American, 0.25% Native American, 0.74% Asian, 0.03% Pacific Islander, 2.15% from other races, and 1.21% from two or more races.  6.53% of the population were Hispanic or Latino of any race.

There were 49,137 households, out of which 21.70% had children under the age of 18 living with them, 54.50% were married couples living together, 8.90% had a female householder with no husband present, and 33.40% were non-families. 28.20% of all households were made up of individuals, and 16.10% had someone living alone who was 65 years of age or older.  The average household size was 2.25 and the average family size was 2.72.

In the county, the population was spread out, with 19.20% under the age of 18, 6.00% from 18 to 24, 22.30% from 25 to 44, 23.30% from 45 to 64, and 29.20% who were 65 years of age or older.  The median age was 47 years. For every 100 females there were 93.70 males.  For every 100 females age 18 and over, there were 90.80 males.

The median income for a household in the county was $39,635, and the median income for a family was $46,385. Males had a median income of $30,870 versus $23,379 for females. The per capita income for the county was $27,227.  About 6.30% of families and 9.30% of the population were below the poverty line, including 13.60% of those under age 18 and 5.70% of those age 65 or over.

Transportation

Airports
 New Hibiscus Airpark
 Sebastian Municipal Airport
 Vero Beach Regional Airport

Bus systems
GoLine is Indian River County's main method of public transportation.  The program was introduced in 1994 to provide an alternative option to driving. Due to County population increases in the early and mid 2000s, Indian River County devised a series of bus routes from Barefoot Bay in southern Brevard County to the south end of Vero Beach.  In 2006, GoLine (formerly known as Indian River Transit) was introduced with more stops along and through the Treasure Coast.  By 2010, the GoLine system had a total of 14 stops with an additional four stops planned for 2011/2012.  Riders pay no fare or fee to board the bus.  In 2010 the buses operated between 8:00 A.M. and 5:00 P.M. weekdays and from 9:00 A.M. to 3:00 P.M. on Saturdays.  Some routes have extended operating hours depending on location.

Train
There is planning underway for an Amtrak station in Vero Beach. Florida East Coast Railway serves a team yard in Vero Beach for off-line customers that don't have direct rail service via spurs. There are two lumber and sheetrock/structural steel customers who receive boxcars, center beam and bulkhead flatcars, and occasionally- gondolas, at the team yard.

Economy
Healthcare, education, government, and retail sales are important employment segments in Indian River County. , the largest employers in the county were:

Libraries

 Indian River County Main Library, in Vero Beach
 North Indian River County Library, in Sebastian
 The Brackett Library, at the Indian River State College Mueller Campus, in Vero Beach

Education
Indian River County School District operates public schools. Public high schools include:
 Freshman Learning Center (VBHS)
 Indian River Charter High School
 Sebastian River High School
 Vero Beach High School

Private schools
 Glendale Christian School
 Indian River Christian School
 Master's Academy
 St. Edwards School
 St. Helen Catholic School
 Tabernacle Baptist School
 The Willow School
 SunCoast Primary School

Colleges and universities
 Indian River State College Mueller Center
 Indian River State College Sebastian Campus

Elections
Indian River County lies at the northern end of a belt stretching to Collier County in the southwest that was the first part of Florida to politically distance itself from the "Solid South": the last Democrat to win a majority in the county was Franklin D. Roosevelt in 1944. In 1992, indeed, Ross Perot came second, fifteen votes ahead of President-elect Bill Clinton, this being one of only three Florida counties where he did so.

Voter registration
According to the Secretary of State's office, Republicans are a plurality of registered voters in Indian River County.

Communities

Cities
 Fellsmere
 Sebastian
 Vero Beach

Towns
 Indian River Shores
 Orchid

Census-designated places

 Florida Ridge
 Gifford
 Roseland
 South Beach
 Vero Beach South
 Wabasso
 Wabasso Beach
 West Vero Corridor
 Windsor (formerly North Beach)
 Winter Beach

Other unincorporated communities

 Blue Cypress Village
 Cummings
 Nevins
 Oslo
 Riomar
 Royal Poinciana Park
 Vero Lake Estates

See also
 National Register of Historic Places listings in Indian River County, Florida
 North Hutchinson Island
 Pelican Island National Wildlife Refuge
 Vero beach power squadron

Notes

References

External links

 Economic Development and Tourism
 Indian River County Chamber of Commerce
 Indian River County Economic Development
 Indian River County Property Search and Demographics
 Indian River County Tourism

Governmental
 Board of County Commissioners
 Indian River County Board of County Commissioners
 Constitutional Officers
 Indian River County Clerk
 Indian River County Supervisor of Elections
 Indian River County Property Appraiser
 Indian River County Sheriff
 Indian River County Tax Collector
 School District
 Indian River County School District
 Multi-county Districts
 Indian River State College
 St. Johns River Water Management District
 Treasure Coast Regional Planning Council
 Judicial
 Indian River County Clerk of Courts
  Public Defender, 19th Judicial Circuit of Florida *  State Attorney, 19th Judicial Circuit of Florida 
  Circuit and County Courts for the 19th Judicial Circuit of Florida

 
Florida counties
1925 establishments in Florida
Populated places established in 1925